Ocrisiona is a genus of jumping spiders that was first described by Eugène Louis Simon in 1901. O. frenata from Hong Kong belongs to a different, unspecified genus, according to Marek Żabka (1990). Eugene Simon places the genus Ocrisiona close to Holoplatys.

Species
 it contains thirteen species, found in China, Hong Kong, New Zealand, and Australia:
Ocrisiona aerata (L. Koch, 1879) – Australia (Queensland)
Ocrisiona cinerea (L. Koch, 1879) – New Zealand
Ocrisiona eucalypti Zabka, 1990 – Australia (Queensland)
Ocrisiona koahi Zabka, 1990 – Australia (Queensland)
Ocrisiona leucocomis (L. Koch, 1879) (type) – Australia, New Zealand
Ocrisiona liturata (L. Koch, 1879) – Australia (Queensland)
Ocrisiona melancholica (L. Koch, 1879) – Eastern Australia, Lord Howe Is.
Ocrisiona melanopyga Simon, 1901 – Australia (Tasmania)
Ocrisiona parallelestriata (L. Koch, 1879) – Australia (Queensland)
Ocrisiona parmeliae Zabka, 1990 – Australia (Western Australia)
Ocrisiona suilingensis Peng, Liu & Kim, 1999 – China
Ocrisiona victoriae Zabka, 1990 – Australia (Victoria)
Ocrisiona yakatunyae Zabka, 1990 – Australia (Western Australia)

Transferred to other genera
 Ocrisiona jovialis (L. Koch, 1879) → Apricia jovialis
 Ocrisiona frenata (Simon, 1901) → Kelawakaju frenata

References

Salticidae genera
Salticidae
Spiders of Asia
Spiders of Oceania
Taxa named by Eugène Simon